The 2009 Indian general election in the state of Tripura was held in April with two seats being contested. The Communist Party of India (Marxist) held both seats, receiving a total of 1,084,883 votes with a state-wide share of 61.69%. Congress and the BJP received 31% and 3% of the state-wide vote, respectively, and won no seats.

List of elected MPs
Source: Election Commission of India

References

Indian general elections in Tripura
Tripura